Aaron Goodvin is a Canadian-American country music singer and songwriter. Active since 2016, he has charted multiple singles on the Billboard Canada Country charts, including the number-one hits "You Are" and "Boy Like Me", and the double platinum-certified "Lonely Drum".

Biography
Goodvin was born in Spirit River, Alberta, Canada. He took interest in music after winning a singing competition at a local shopping mall at age 12. His family moved to St. Albert, Alberta, by the time he was a teenager. At age 25, Goodvin moved to Nashville, Tennessee, to pursue his career in country music. After performing in local venues, he was signed to a songwriting contract with Warner Chappell Music, which led to him writing the track "Out Like That" on Luke Bryan's 2013 album Crash My Party. Scottish-Canadian country singer Johnny Reid then began mentoring Goodvin and hired him as an opening act. This led to him signing a contract with Warner Music Canada in April 2016.

The label issued Goodvin's self-titled debut album in 2016, which accounted for three entries on the Billboard Canada Country charts. "Lonely Drum", one of the singles, was certified double platinum by Music Canada and received a nomination for Songwriter of the Year at the Canadian Country Music Awards. In 2018, he signed an American record deal with Reviver Records. In 2019, Goodvin released his second album, V, which includes the singles "You Are", "Bars & Churches", "Good Ol' Bad Days", and "Every Time You Take Your Time". The album received a Juno Award nomination for Country Album of the Year at the Juno Awards of 2020.

In 2022, Goodvin signed a new Canadian record deal with Sakamoto Music, and released the single "You Ain't" featuring Meghan Patrick.

Discography

Albums

Extended plays

Singles

Awards and nominations

Notes

References

Canadian country singer-songwriters
American country singer-songwriters
Musicians from Alberta
Musicians from Nashville, Tennessee
Living people
Warner Records artists
Canadian male singer-songwriters
American male singer-songwriters
Date of birth unknown
Canadian Country Music Association Songwriter(s) of the Year winners
Year of birth missing (living people)
Singer-songwriters from Tennessee